The 2007 St Kilda Football Club season was the 111th in the club's history. Coached by Ross Lyon and co-captained by Nick Riewoldt, Lenny Hayes and Luke Ball, they competed in the AFL's 2007 Toyota Premiership Season.

The club finished ninth on the premiership ladder; winning 11 games, losing 10 and drawing one. It was the first time since 2003 the team failed to qualify for the finals series.

Standings

References

External links

Listing of St Kilda game results in 2007

St Kilda Football Club Season, 2007
St Kilda Football Club seasons
St Kilda Football Club Season, 2007